Albertus Susanto Njoto (born 27 October 1976) is a badminton player from Indonesia. He moved to Hong Kong due to tight competition in Indonesia. In Hong Kong, he partnered with another Indonesian, Yohan Hadikusumo Wiratama, in men's doubles. He won the men's doubles title at the Philippines Open in 2006, and also was the mixed doubles bronze medallist at the 2005 Asian Badminton Championships.

Achievements

Asian Championships 
Mixed doubles

BWF Grand Prix 
The BWF Grand Prix has two levels, the Grand Prix and Grand Prix Gold. It is a series of badminton tournaments sanctioned by the Badminton World Federation (BWF) since 2007.

Men's doubles

 BWF Grand Prix Gold tournament
 BWF Grand Prix tournament

BWF International Challenge/Series/Satellite
Men's doubles

Mixed doubles

 BWF International Challenge tournament
 BWF International Series/ Satellite tournament

References

External links

IBF Player Profile

Living people
1976 births
Indonesian male badminton players
Hong Kong male badminton players
Australian male badminton players
Hong Kong people of Indonesian descent
Badminton players at the 2006 Asian Games
Asian Games competitors for Hong Kong